The Pinnacle Fire was a wildfire that started near Safford, Arizona on June 10, 2021. The fire burned  and was fully contained on July 16, 2021.

Events

June 
The Pinnacle Fire was first reported on June 10, 2021, at around 12:00 pm MST.

Cause 
The cause of the fire is currently unknown and is under investigation.

Containment 
On July 16, 2021, the Pinnacle Fire reached 100% containment.

Impact

Closures and Evacuations

References 

2021 Arizona wildfires
June 2021 events in the United States
Wildfires in Arizona